The Ambassador of the United Kingdom to the Republic of Madagascar is the United Kingdom's foremost diplomatic representative in Madagascar, and head of the UK's diplomatic mission in Antananarivo.

Madagascar gained independence from France in 1960 and Andrew Ronalds, who had previously been Consul-General, was appointed the first ambassador until he retired in the following year. For two periods there has been no resident ambassador: from 1975 to 1979 the High Commissioner to Tanzania was also non-resident ambassador to Madagascar, and from 2005 to 2012 the High Commissioner to Mauritius was non-resident ambassador.

Madagascar has applied to join the Commonwealth of Nations. If and when it is admitted, the ambassador will become a High Commissioner and the embassy will become a High Commission.

Ambassadors
1960–1961: Andrew Ronalds 
1961–1962: John Street 
1963–1967: Alan Horn 
1967–1970: Mervyn Brown
1970–1975: Timothy Crosthwait
1975–1978: Mervyn Brown (non-resident) 	
1978–1979: Peter Moon (non-resident) 	
1980–1984: Richard Langridge 
1984–1987: Malcolm McBain 
1987–1990: Anthony Hayday 
1990–1992: Dennis Amy 
1993–1996: Peter Smith
1996–1999: Robert Dewar
1999–2002: Charles Mochan 
2002–2005: Brian Donaldson
2005–2005: Anthony Godson (non-resident) 
2007–2010: John Murton (non-resident) 
2010–2012: Nicholas Leake (non-resident) 
2012–2017: Timothy Smart 
2017-2020: Phil Boyle 

2020–: David Ashley

References

External links
UK in Madagascar – British Embassy Madagascar

Madagascar
 
United Kingdom Ambassadors